The 2004 Cork Intermediate Hurling Championship was the 95th staging of the Cork Intermediate Hurling Championship since its establishment by the Cork County Board in 1909. The draw for the opening round fixtures took place on 10 February 2004. The championship began on 30 April 2004 and ended on 24 October 2004.

On 24 October 2004, Watergrasshill won the championship after a 2-13 to 2–08 defeat of Dromina in the final at Páirc Uí Chaoimh. It remains their only championship title in the grade.

Nemo Rangers' James Masters was the championship's top scorer with 4-34.

Format change

In 2003 the Cork County Board Executive established a Hurling Championship Review Committee in an effort to improve the competitiveness of the Cork Senior Championship. The committee also proposed the splitting of the existing Cork Intermediate Championship in two with the creation of a 16-team Premier Intermediate Championship and a 16-team Intermediate Hurling Championship. The 10 lowest-ranked teams from the 2003 Intermediate Championship were joined by the 2003 Junior Championship winners as well as the individual divisional winners - Argideen Rangers, Kanturk, Carrigaline, Blackrock and Watergrasshill. Grenagh, who won the Mid Cork Junior Championship division in the junior grade, declined the invitation.

Results

First round

Second round

Third round

 Valley Rovers, Carrigaline, Dromina and St. Vincent's received byes in this round.

Quarter-finals

Semi-finals

Final

Championship statistics

Top scorers

Overall

In a single game

References

Cork Intermediate Hurling Championship
Cork Intermediate Hurling Championship